Tuzin.fm is a private non-profit Belarusian web-portal, which was created in 2003 to cover musical creativity in Belarus. Among its objectives, the site promotes music written in Belarus and motivates to listen to Belarusian songs as large an audience as possible. It initiates and implements music projects and is the information partner of the most significant events of the Belarusian independent music scene. Independently determining its information policy, the nature and content of the information, advertising, audio, and video materials, in 2009 the mass media had more than 50 thousand monthly visitors who downloaded more than 80 thousand songs.

History 
The portal began operations on October 12, 2003. The site has changed its address several times. Initially, it was available over at music.fromby.net. Later on, the address was changed to tuzin.fm, but after problems with the domain, it was moved to tuzinfm.by. Since May 2017 the portal is available over at tuzin.by too. The back catalogue of articles is presented over at mpby.ru.

In 2004 together with the Belarusian Collegium, it published the book «» with a description of 20 music albums from the 1970–1990 years.

Since 2004, it broadcasts the radio version of its hit parade, entitled «», which is anchored by the lead singer of the band  . From the beginning, airing was on Radio Rocks (Minsk), since 2005 on Radio Minsk, since 2006 on Radio Racyja (Białystok). In 2005–2011, it annually releases a compilation of 12 winning songs from the network’s hit parade called «» (2005, 2006, 2007, 2008, 2009, 2011). In 2005–2007, it took part in the holding of the ceremony of awarding the best musicians of the country «». On March 16, 2006, it held the concert “Rock Revolution” in Vilnius (Lithuania) with the participation of N.R.M. In 2006, together with the label VoliaMusic, it published the compilation album «». On November 3, 2007, in the church of Saints Simon and Helena in Minsk, it held a memory concert to collect funds for a monument for poet Anatol Sys. On August 31, 2008, in Minsk, after a 12-year hiatus, it restored the music festival «». 

In 2009 and 2011 together with the public movement Budzma Belarusians!, it released music CDs Tuzin. Perazagruzka and Budzma! Tuzin. Perazagruzka-2 with translated into Belarusian songs by foreign-language performers. In 2011–2012 it arranged the acoustic concert series «» with the participation of Belarusian rock bands. In 2012–2013 it held a series of concerts «». In 2012, together with Radio Racyja (Białystok), it issued the audiobook «» by Sergey Vitushka. In 2012–2013 together with the Podlasie Opera and Philharmonic, it prepared a musical voiceover disk of the Belarusian silent film classics «». In June 2014 together with the Viasna Human Rights Centre, it released the collection of songs «». Also in 2014 together with the Foundation «», it held a contest of young performers «», another one was opened in 2017.

As a continuation of Tuzin. Perazagruzka and Budzma! Tuzin. Perazagruzka-2, a new similar project “Global Reload” was started in 2014, featuring Andrey Makarevich and more.

Appraisal 
In the interview with the founder Siarhei Budkin in connection with the 1st anniversary of the site, Volha Samusik of Muzykalnaya Gazeta stated that music.fromby.net was the most popular among Belarusian Internet portals. In her feature in 2005, she also described Tuzin.fm as “the most popular Belarusian music site.” In a report from its 5th anniversary party, Tuzin.fm was introduced by Belorusy i rynok’s Anna Zhdanovich as “one of the largest resources on the Internet devoted to Belarusian music.”

Being interviewed by Muzykalnaya Gazeta in 2006, rock-princess Rusya recognized that the portal, which “has gained momentum,” is the godfather of her band Indiga.

During the presentation of the compilation album “” in 2008, musician Lavon Volski pointed out that Tuzin.fm “is the only competent hit parade in Belarus.”

The founder of  Viačaslaŭ Radyjonaŭ gave his assessment of the portal on its seven-year anniversary via Budzma Belarusians!: “That is a unique and very timely phenomenon. It appeared exactly when Belarusian-language music needed support and the opportunity to bring it to a large audience.”

In a review of all Belarusian music awards for 2013, Paviel Svierdlov, editor of “KYKY.ORG”, criticized the portal because the hit parade did not work for a year, but praised offline activities, “two excellent projects: “” and “”.”

Released with the participation of the portal disks 
 Прэм’ер Тузін (2005–2011)
 Песьні свабоды (2006)
 Tuzin. Perazagruzka (2009)
 Budzma! Tuzin. Perazagruzka-2 (2011)
  (fairytales by Sergey Vitushka)
  (disk and art-project, 2012–2013)
 Апошні золак (collaboration project and music compilation, 2013–2014)
 Re:Песьняры (concert and disk, 2014)

Concerts and other projects 
 Героі году (musical awards, annual since 2011)
 Belsat Music Live (musical program for Belsat TV, ongoing since 2017)
 (Не)расстраляныя (2017–2018)

State pressure 
In 2013 the Brest concert in support of the project  was canceled by the city administration due ideological reasons.

Awards and nominations 
 CD + MP3 «Прэм’ер Тузін-2005» (The “Rock Coronation Awards 2005,” “Project of the Year”)
 CD + MP3 «Прэм’ер Тузін-2006» (The “Rock Coronation Awards 2006,” “Project of the Year”)
 Tuzin.fm (Rock-kola-2007, certificate “For Active Support of Youth Creativity and a Significant Contribution to the Development of the Belarusian Rock Movement”)
 Tuzin. Perazagruzka (The “Rock Coronation Awards 2009,” “Project of the Year”)
 Budzma! Tuzin. Perazagruzka-2 (The “Ultra-Music Awards-2011,” “Project of the Year”)
 Concert series «Тузін.Немаўля» (The “Ultra-Music Awards-2012,” “Event of the Year”)
 CD + MP3 «Прэм’ер Тузін-2011» (according to the record label Vigma, the best-selling disc of the year)
 Project «Радыё Tuzin.fm» (author: Christina Doropey) (The forum «» (2014), 2nd place in the commercial section)
 Contest project «Засьпявай» (author: Christina Doropey) (The forum «» (2015), 1st place in the category of PR-projects)
 Triple DVD-edition and the concert series «Тузін.Немаўля» (authors: Siarhei Budkin, Tuzin.fm, Podlasie Opera and Philharmonic) (The festival of advertising and communication «AD.NAK-2014,» 2nd place in the category of socially significant projects)

 Logo of «Тузін.Немаўля» (author: studio Adliga) (The festival of advertising and communication “AD.NAK-2014,” 2nd place in the category of logos)
 Poster of the «Прастытутка» film from the «Тузін.Немаўля» project (author: Vasilisa Palyanina-Kolenda) (The festival of advertising and communication “AD.NAK-2014,” 3rd place in the category of posters)
 
 

Tuzin.fm portal’s design (author: studio Pras.by) (The festival of advertising and communication “AD.NAK-2014,” nomination in the category of websites)

Tuzin.Unplugged (The festival of advertising and communication “AD.NAK-2014,” nomination in the category of socially significant projects)

 
 

 Re:Песьняры (author: Siarhei Budkin) (The festival of advertising and communication “AD.NAK-2015,” 2nd place in the category of socially significant projects)
 Апошні золак (The festival of advertising and communication “AD.NAK-2015,” 2nd place in the category of socially significant projects)
 The Global Reload project and the competition «Засьпявай 2.0» (The Highlights of 2015 by Budzma Belarusians! in the category of “Main Musical Events of the Year”)
  (author: Siarhei Budkin) (The Adami Media Prize-2018, Special Mention in the category of “TV Entertainment”)

References

External links
 RSS-feed
 Belsat Music Live playlist (YouTube)

Internet properties established in 2003
Mass media companies of Belarus
Mass media in Minsk
Belarusian news websites
2003 establishments in Belarus
Publications established in 2003
Belarusian music websites
Censorship in Belarus